The World Silambam Association (WSA) is the official international body of Silambam for Worldwide and a recognized Non-Governmental Organization. On November 22, 1999, the primary name of Silambam, which originated from the ancient Tamil Nadu State of India, was documented by Guruji Murugan Chillayah to become the official organization name to provide Indian traditional arts and sports for education, health, fitness, culture, nature, climate change, recreation, and dissemination work. The primary name Silambam was legally registered and recognized as a formalized organization after receiving security clearance approval from the Regulatory Authority. It was followed by the formation of Silambam Asia, registered with members from twelve countries on the Asia continent and officially recognized by the United Nations, which has expanded and grown further throughout the Asia continent and worldwide. The World Silambam Association which was established with the Ministry of Home Affairs (JPPM) in Malaysia, has more than 25 country members from five continents worldwide and is rapidly expanding to preserve and safeguard the essence of Silambam worldwide. World Silambam Association (WSA) was officially recognized by the United Nations and is in partnership with the United Nations Sustainable Development Goals.

Mission and values

The mission of the World Silambam Association (WSA) to provide effective international governance by constantly improve technical rules and regulating Silambam competitions or participation in International events or sporting arena, to be recognized as an Olympic sport and Paralympic sport.

World Silambam Association (WSA) also plays active roles as an international organization for governance and sustainable development on the Indian Traditional Martial Arts and Sports for Education, Health, Fitness, Culture, Nature, Climate Change, Recreational, and dissemination all these related information. Thus, the vital role to provide expertise for members by providing the Training, Research, Revive, Rejuvenate, Retention, and Restore.

By establishing Silambam in both traditional arts and modern sports games to group everyone collectively in similar activities, World Silambam Association (WSA) aims to promote the sustainability for members and the members' visibility worldwide.

Competition and events
Most common domestic/international Silambam competition categories for practitioners.

Silambam Age Divisions
Official Silambam World Championship Age Divisions (சிலம்பம் வயது பிரிவு) for both Boys and Girls in Individual and Team. Athletes under 13-years of age are not allowed to play in any official Silambam World Championship, also in the events organized either under the auspices or sanctioned by the World Silambam Association. The lower age limit for all Tournaments is 13-years (calendar year on Tournament Registration Date).

National Federation (NF) should use the term YOUTH to define "Cadets" and "Juniors" for age groups from 13–18 years, that are different from the Cadet and Junior ages.

The following age categories are recognized by the World Silambam Association (WSA) categories which are divided into men and women divisions, and classified into as follows:

Silambam Weight Divisions
Tournament Format and Schedules for the Silambam World Championship.

The Tournaments: Masters, Continental Championship Senior, Junior and Cadet, World Championship Senior, Junior, and Cadet - normally consist of two sessions, the preliminaries, and the final block. The Tournament phases that take place in the sessions depend on the type of event. Any changes to this will be agreed upon and approved by the World Silambam Association (WSA). Depending on the number of the Silambam Players some rounds may not be required for every category. The Silambam World Championship events schedule for the non-World Silambam Association (WSA) should be agreed by all interested parties.

Players will be weighed using an electronic weighing machine. Must be within the weight criteria.

Silambam World Championship required the competitors to be in good physical condition. It demands a lot of stamina and endurance to be able to compete in this event. Any overweight or not within weight criteria will not be allowed to participate in the Silambam Sports event due to health concerns.

See also

Angampora
Banshay
Bataireacht
Bōjutsu
Gatka
Jūkendō
Kalaripayattu
Kendo
Kenjutsu
Krabi–krabong
Kuttu Varisai
Mardani khel
Silambam
Silambam Asia
Tahtib
Thang-ta
Varma kalai
World Silambam Association

References

External links
 Official World Silambam Association
 Official Silambam Asia

Indian martial arts
Dravidian martial arts
Tamil martial arts
Stick-fighting
Tamil culture
Martial arts organizations
Martial arts governing bodies
Sports governing bodies by sport